The Northwest Labor Press is a newspaper which covers the American labor movement in the Pacific Northwest. It was known as the Portland Labor Press from 1900 to 1915, the Oregon Labor Press until 1986, and by its present name since then.

The newspaper covers union organizing campaigns, contract negotiations, strikes, and news about labor unions in Oregon and southwest Washington.

The target audience for the journal comprises workers, and union leaders and members. Its reporting is sometimes picked up in other publications.

The Northwest Labor Press was founded in 1900, and is one of the oldest trade union publications in the United States.  It is published biweekly by the Oregon Labor Press Publishing Company, a non-profit organization co-owned by 20 local labor unions and the Oregon AFL-CIO.

References

External links
 

Biweekly newspapers published in the United States
Newspapers published in Oregon
Publications established in 1900

1900 establishments in Oregon